Amorbia is a genus of moths belonging to the subfamily Tortricinae of the family Tortricidae.

Species
Group curitiba
Amorbia curitiba Phillips & Powell, 2007
Amorbia stenovalvae Phillips & Powell, 2007
Group productana
Amorbia catarina Phillips & Powell, 2007
Amorbia dominicana Phillips & Powell, 2007
Amorbia productana (Walker, 1863)
Amorbia revolutana Zeller, 1877
Group humerosana
Amorbia cuneanum (Walsingham, 1879)
Amorbia humerosana Clemens, 1860
Amorbia santamaria Phillips & Powell, 2007
Group chiapas
Amorbia chiapas Phillips & Powell, 2007
Amorbia potosiana Phillips & Powell, 2007
Group colubrana
Amorbia cacoa Phillips & Polwell, 2007
Amorbia cocori Phillips & Powell, 2007
Amorbia colubrana (Zeller, 1866)
Amorbia exustana (Zeller, 1866)
Amorbia knudsoni Phillips & Powell, 2007
Amorbia laterculana (Zeller, 1877)
Amorbia nuptana (Felder & Rogenhofer, 1875)
Amorbia osmotris Meyrick, 1932
Group exsectana
Amorbia exsectana (Zeller, 1877)
Group rectangularis
Amorbia concavana (Zeller, 1877)
Amorbia emigratella Busck, 1909, Mexican leaf-roller
Amorbia rectangularis Meyrick, 1931
Group decerptana
Amorbia chlorolyca Meyrick, 1931
Amorbia cordobana Phillips & Powell, 2007
Amorbia decerptana (Zeller, 1877)
Amorbia eccopta Walsingham, 1913
Amorbia monteverde Phillips & Powell, 2007
Amorbia rhombobasis Phillips & Powell, 2007
Species group unknown
Amorbia depicta Walsingham, 1913
Amorbia effoetana (Moschler, 1891)
Amorbia elaeopetra Meyrick, 1932
Amorbia jaczewskii Razowski & Wojtusiak, 2008
Amorbia helioxantha Meyrick, 1917
Amorbia leptophracta (Meyrick, 1931)
Amorbia maracayana Amsel, 1956
Amorbia rectilineana (Zeller, 1877)
Amorbia trisecta Razowski & Wojtusiak, 2010
Amorbia vero Powell & Brown, 2012

Former species
Amorbia teratana (Zeller, 1877)

See also
List of Tortricidae genera

References

 , 1860, Proc. Acad. Nat. Sci.Philad. 12: 352.
 ;  2007: Phylogenetic relationships, systematics, and biology of the species of Amorbia Clemens (Lepidoptera: Tortricidae: Sparganothini).
 , 2010: Tortricidae (Lepidoptera) from Peru. Acta Zoologica Cracoviensia 53B (1-2): 73-159. . Full article: .

External links
tortricidae.com

Sparganothini
Tortricidae genera